The 3DO Interactive Multiplayer is a 32-bit home video game console developed by The 3DO Company and designed by New Technologies Group, released in North America by Panasonic first on October 4, 1993. It was the first programmable console developed under the 3DO brand and the only one to be officially released on the market. The following list contains all of the known games released for the 3DO platform as well as aftermarket (homebrew) titles and arcade games that used the 3DO hardware.

Unveiled at the May's 1992 Summer Consumer Electronics Show, hosting a number of cutting-edge technologies and highly promoted during launch including being named Time magazine's "1993 Product of the Year", the 3DO Interactive Multiplayer is unique from all fifth generation consoles in that its technical specifications could be licensed by third parties such as GoldStar (now LG Corp) and Sanyo for manufacturing while The 3DO Company would collect a royalty on each console sold and on each game published. The system was released to compete with 16-bit consoles such as the Sega Genesis and Super Nintendo Entertainment System and other systems such as the Amiga CD32, Atari Jaguar, Philips CD-i and later in its life cycle the PlayStation and Sega Saturn. The 3DO struggled to achieve a substantial success during most of its life and by late 1996, the platform and game development for it were discontinued. A total of more than 200 games were developed and released for the console during its official commercial run. Originally released at US$699.99, later 3DO models were less expensive to manufacture than the launch unit and were sold for considerably lower prices. Around 2 million units were sold in total. A successor, the Panasonic M2, was slated for release but its launch was aborted.

Commercially released games 
There are currently  officially released 3DO Interactive Multiplayer games on this list.

Non-game software and Compilations

Unlicensed games

Arcade games

See also 
 List of cancelled 3DO Interactive Multiplayer games
 Lists of video games

Notes

References

External links 
 List of 3DO Interactive Multiplayer games at MobyGames

3DO Interactive Multiplayer